José Luis Lamadrid Prados (3 July 1930 – 3 October 2021) was a Mexican professional footballer who played as a forward for Club Necaxa and who represented Mexico in the 1954 FIFA World Cup. He was also a commentator along with Fernando Marcos for TV Azteca in the 1990s.

References

External links
FIFA profile
José Luis Lamadrid's obituary 

1930 births
2021 deaths
Mexican footballers
Association football forwards
Mexico international footballers
1954 FIFA World Cup players
Liga MX players
Club Necaxa footballers